Conkling is a surname. Notable people with the surname include:

Alfred Conkling (1789–1874), American lawyer and politician
Alfred R. Conkling (1850–1917), American geologist, lawyer, and author, and politician
Chris Conkling (born 1949), American screenwriter
E. Leslie Conkling (1931–2014), American politician and educator
Frederick A. Conkling (1816–1891), American politician
Grace Conkling (1878–1958), American writer
Helen Conkling (born 1933), American poet
Hilda Conkling (1910–1986), American poet
James C. Conkling (1816–1899), American politician
Mabel Conkling (1871–1966), American sculptor
Philip Wheeler Conkling (born ?), conservation attorney and author
Roscoe Conkling (1829–1888), American politician
Roscoe P. Conkling (1889–1954), Missouri supreme court justice
Roscoe Seely Conkling (1884–1956), deputy attorney general of New York
Wallace E. Conkling (1896–1976), American Episcopal bishop

See also
Conklin (disambiguation)